Harry Laverne Anderson (October 14, 1952 – April 16, 2018) was an American actor, comedian and magician. He is best known for his role of Judge Harry Stone on the 1984–1992 television series Night Court. He later starred in the sitcom Dave's World from 1993 to 1997.

In addition to eight appearances on Saturday Night Live between 1981 and 1985, Anderson had a recurring guest role as con man Harry "The Hat" Gittes on Cheers. He toured extensively as a magician, and did several magic/comedy shows for broadcast, including Harry Anderson's Sideshow (1987). He played Richie Tozier in the 1990 miniseries It, based on the Stephen King novel of the same name.

Early life
Anderson was born October 14, 1952, in Newport, Rhode Island. He spent much of his youth performing magic on the streets of Chicago, New York, St. Louis and New Orleans before landing in California at the age of 16. After moving to Los Angeles, he joined the Dante Magic Club and worked as a street magician in San Francisco when he was 17. He attended Buena Park High School before graduating from North Hollywood High School in 1970 as class valedictorian. After high school, he attended Fullerton College. From 1971 to 1976, he lived in Ashland, Oregon, performing magic and working with the Oregon Shakespeare Festival.

Career
Anderson's many appearances on Saturday Night Live during the show's seventh, eighth, and ninth seasons, as well as hosting an episode on the show's tenth season, led to his role as Harry "The Hat" Gittes on several seasons of the television sitcom Cheers, and eventually as Judge Harry Stone on the sitcom Night Court. He went on to appear in other television specials and shows, including 12 appearances on The Tonight Show Starring Johnny Carson.

As a magician, Anderson toured extensively and performed in comedy/magic shows for clubs and broadcast, including Harry Anderson's Sideshow in 1987. In 1990, he starred in the television adaptation of Stephen King's It as the adult Richie Tozier. From 1993 to 1997, he starred in the television sitcom Dave's World, based loosely on the life and columns of humorist Dave Barry.

Together with longtime friend Turk Pipkin, Anderson wrote a book called Games You Can't Lose: A Guide for Suckers, a collection of gags, cons, tricks and scams. First published in 1989 (2001 reprint), it also contains a survey of "Games You Can't Win" told from an insider's perspective. He appeared with Criss Angel in a TV special called The Science of Magic, later released on DVD.

In 2000, Anderson hosted the pilot for a potential revival of the panel game show What's My Line? for CBS primetime.

He moved from Pasadena, California, to New Orleans in 2002. In 2002, he and his second wife, Elizabeth, whom he met in New Orleans while she was bartending, opened a small shop in the French Quarter named "Spade & Archer Curiosities by Appointment" (later named "Sideshow"), selling various "magic, curiosities, and apocrypha".

In 2005, Anderson opened a nightclub in the French Quarter, Oswald's Speakeasy, at 1331 Decatur Street at the corner of Esplanade Avenue. He performed a one-man show there called Wise Guy.

Anderson appeared in Hexing a Hurricane, a documentary about the first six months in New Orleans after Hurricane Katrina. He and his wife sold Oswald's Speakeasy in October 2006. He continued to present his evening show Wise Guy, originally developed for his theater in New Orleans.

In November 2008, Anderson played himself on an episode of 30 Rock, along with fellow former Night Court cast members Markie Post and Charles Robinson.

In his final years, Anderson appeared in television comedy series such as Comedy Bang! Bang! (2013) and Gotham Comedy Live (2014). His final film portrayal was as Professor Kaman in the 2014 Christian drama film A Matter of Faith.

Personal life
Anderson was a longtime fan of singer Mel Tormé, and his character Judge Stone on Night Court was also a Tormé fan; the singer appeared on the sitcom six times. Night Court creator Reinhold Weege said that Anderson and his character both being Tormé fans was completely coincidental. Anderson was among those who delivered eulogies at the singer's funeral in 1999.

Anderson was married twice. In 1977 he married Leslie Pollack (b. 1953); they had two children, a daughter, Eva Fay Anderson, and a son, Dashiell Anderson, before divorcing in 1999. In 2000 he married Elizabeth Morgan (b. 1973). In 2006, Anderson and his wife moved from New Orleans to Asheville, North Carolina.

Death
In late January 2018, Anderson had a bout of influenza and subsequently suffered several strokes. On April 16, 2018, he died in his sleep of a stroke due to influenza and heart disease at his home in Asheville, North Carolina, at the age of 65.

Filmography

Film

Television

Video games

References

External links 
 

1952 births
2018 deaths
20th-century American male actors
American street performers
American magicians
American male comedians
American male television actors
Male actors from New Orleans
Male actors from Rhode Island
People from Newport, Rhode Island
Writers from Asheville, North Carolina
20th-century American comedians
North Hollywood High School alumni
Deaths from influenza
Infectious disease deaths in North Carolina
Academy of Magical Arts Lecturer of the Year winners
Academy of Magical Arts Magician of the Year winners